Hamhŭng (Hamhŭng-si) is North Korea's second-most populous city, and the capital of South Hamgyŏng Province. It has an estimated population of 768,551. Located in the southern part of the South Hamgyong province, Hamhung is the main and most popular metropolitan area in the province. Hamhung has a thriving local economy compared to other metropolitan areas in North Korea, and it is known by North Koreans as a great area of architectural construction that was centrally planned, and built by the government of North Korea.

Administrative divisions 
Hamhŭng is divided into 7 guyŏk (wards):

Geography
Hamhŭng is on the left branch of the Sŏngch'ŏn River, on the eastern part of the Hamhŭng plain, in South Hamgyŏng Province, northeast North Korea.

Climate
Hamhung has a humid continental climate (Köppen climate classification: Dwa), with warm, humid summers, and moderately cold, dry winters. Being located by the East Sea, its climate is directly influenced by it, resulting in warmer winters and cooler summers than areas similar in latitude on the western coast. The longer period of warmer temperatures benefit the growing of crops.

History

The city was called either Hamju (as recorded in 1108, the third year of King Yejeong) or Hamjumok (as recorded in 1369, 18th year of King Gongmin). It received its current name of Hamhung in 1416, when it was promoted to a 'bu'. The letter '흥', added to the original name of Hamju, means that the town would prosper.

Yi Seong-gye, founder of the Yi dynasty, retired to the city after a successful palace coup by his son Yi Bang-won in 1400. Though his son sent envoys to reconcile, his father had them killed. A modern Korean expression, 'King's envoy to Hamhŭng', refers to a person who goes on a journey and is never heard from again. It was known as Kankō during Japanese rule of Korea between 1910 and 1945. It was liberated by the Red Army on 22 August 1945.

The city was 80–90% destroyed by American air raids during the Korean War (1950–1953) and was occupied by ROK troops between 17 October 1950 and 17 December 1950. From 1955 to 1962, Hamhŭng was the object of a large-scale program of reconstruction and development by East Germany including the build-up of construction-related industries and intense training measures for Korean construction workers, engineers, city planners and architects. When the Bauhaus trained architect Konrad Püschel, the first Head of City Planning for the reconstruction project arrived in 1955, he was accompanied by about 175 members of the Deutsche Arbeitsgruppe (DAG) or German Working Group Hamhung as the project team was called.
The project ended two years earlier than scheduled and with a low profile because of the Sino-Soviet conflict and the opposing positions that North Korea and East Germany took on that issue.

From 1960 to 1967, Hamhŭng was administered separately from South Hamgyŏng as a Directly Governed City (Chikhalsi). Before 1960 and since 1967, the city has been part of South Hamgyŏng Province.

In 1995, Hamhŭng witnessed, thus far, one of the only documented challenges to the North Korean government when famine-ravaged soldiers began a march toward Pyongyang. The revolt was quelled and the unit of soldiers was disbanded.

The North Korean famine of the 1990s appears to have had a disproportionate effect on the people of Hamhung. Andrew Natsios, a former aid worker, USAID administrator, and author of The Great North Korean Famine, described Hamhung as "the city most devastated by [the] famine." Contemporary published reports from The Washington Post and Reuters describe numerous fresh graves on the surrounding hillsides and report that many of Hamhung's children were stunted by malnutrition. One survivor claimed that more than 10% of the city's population died, with another 10% fleeing the city in search of food. Despite previously being closed to foreigners, foreign nationals can now travel to Hamhung through the few approved North Korean tour operators.

There is speculation that Hamhung, with its high proportion of chemists and the site of a chemical-industrial complex built by the Japanese during World War II, might be the center for North Korea's methamphetamine production.

Economy
Hamhung is much more economically diverse than most cities in North Korea, as Hamhung has many unique industries. Hamhung's rural areas are used for farm land and food distribution through the community. These lands mainly consist of paddies, but other crops are grown in small portion as well. Hamhŭng is an important chemical industry center in the DPRK. It is an industrial city which serves as a major port for North Korean foreign trade. Production includes textiles (particularly vinalon), metalware, machinery, refined oil and processed food. 2·8 vinalon union enterprise is located here.

While prior to liberation of Korea Hamhung had an extremely backwards economy due to the destructive actions of the Japanese, the city was rapidly developed afterwards, with new industrial districts being built and being broken free of colonial acquisitions of material. Much of the heavy industrial equipment used in other cities are built in Hamhung, and its production contributes to the monumental construction of buildings under projects launched by the Workers' Party.

Transportation
The city is a transportation hub, connecting various eastern ports and the northern interior area. Hamhung Station is on the Pyongra Line railway. This city is connected by air too, with Toksan Airport. The city is also served by the narrow gauge, commuter Soho Line linking West Hamhung to Hungnam, via February 28 Vinylon factory.

The city has a large trolleybus network, which opened in 1973 with the Hoyang - Doksong line, with a depot located at the northern Doksong terminus. The second and third lines, a pair of intercity lines from Hamhung station to the Hungnam area, was opened on 27 July 1991. This line had two branches, one to Hungdok and one to Ryongsong with the depot in Hungdok, though the latter line was closed and dismantled sometime in the early 2000s. A set of overhead wires connects the two separate lines, though there is no regular movement on this line. The lines was served by 28 trolleybuses in 2013.

Culture
 Hamhŭng hosts the Hamhŭng Grand Theatre, the largest theatre in North Korea. A national museum is located in Hamhŭng.

Education
Hamhŭng is home to the Hamhŭng University of Education, Hamhŭng University of Pharmacy, Hamhŭng University of Chemistry and Hamhŭng University of Medicine. Professional colleges in Hamhǔng include the Hamhǔng College of Quality Control, the Hamhŭng Hydrographic and Power College, and the Hamhǔng College of Electronics and Automation. There is also a branch academy of science.

In 2018, the South Hamgyong Sci-Tech Library, the largest facility of its kind outside Pyongyang, opened in the city.

Prisons
Two reeducation camps are located near Hamhung: Kyo-hwa-so No. 9 is in northeastern Hamhung, and Kyo-hwa-so No. 22 is in Yonggwang County north of Hamhung.

People born in Hamhŭng
 Yi Seonggye (1335–1408), the founder of the Chosŏn dynasty, Korea's last royal line
 Ahn Soo-kil (1911–1977), South Korean writer
 Richard E. Kim (1932–2009), Korean-American writer
 Yoon Kwang-cho (born 1946), South Korean ceramic artist
 Yang Hyong-sop (1925–2022), President of the Supreme People's Assembly from 1984 to 1998

Twin towns – sister cities
Hamhung is twinned with:
  Shanghai, People's Republic of China - since 1982

See also

 List of cities in North Korea
 Geography of North Korea
 List of provinces of Balhae

Footnotes

Further reading

Dormels, Rainer. North Korea's Cities: Industrial facilities, internal structures and typification. Jimoondang, 2014.

External links

North Korea Uncovered, (North Korea Google Earth) Maps out Hamhung's economic infrastructure, including railways, hotels, tourist destinations, cultural facilities, ports, and electricity grid on Google Earth.
Hamhung, Haunted City, Compares newly revealed Google Earth imagery of Hamhung—imagery which reveals many of the hills around the city to be packed with graves—with published reports of severe famine in Hamhung during the 1990s.
Young Pioneer Tours, Information on the opening up of Hamhung to tourists, and details on tours there.
City profile of Hamhung 
 video of Hamhŭng streets
 video of central Hamhŭng
 

 
Cities in South Hamgyong
Port cities and towns in North Korea
Socialist planned cities